George Gomez is an industrial designer, video game designer, and pinball designer who has worked for Bally, Williams, and Stern Pinball, among other companies. He worked on the team that created the Tron video game, and headed the team that created Spy Hunter. In 1984  after the 1983 video game crash, he left Midway to invent toys at the consulting firm Marvin Glass & Associates. 

He is the inventor of numerous toys, including Tonka's "Splash Darts" and Galoob's "Crash-N-Bash". 

After Glass, he worked on numerous projects through the contract manufacturer Grand products, including the Battletech Centers and several Sega, Jaleco and Taito  coin op video games of the late 80's. In '93 he became a designer at Williams Electronics and designed several notable pinball machines including Monster Bash and was one of the lead developers of the Pinball 2000 system. 

After Williams closed the pinball division, he re-joined Midway Games and was one of key designers of the street basketball video game series NBA Ballers . While at Midway he became a consultant designer to Stern Pinball; during this time he designed several games, including The Lord of the Rings, Batman the Dark Knight, Playboy and The Sopranos.  Since July 11, 2011 he has been the Chief Creative Officer for Stern Pinball, responsible for all of the company's product development efforts.

Arcade video games
(incomplete list)
Designed the joystick for Gorf (1981), which was used on numerous other Bally arcade games
Satan's Hollow (1982)
Tron (1982)
Discs of Tron (1983) (including design of the "environmental cabinet")
Spy Hunter (1983)

Console video games 
NBA Ballers: Chosen One (2008), Midway Games, Inc.
NBA Ballers: Phenom (2006), Midway Games, Inc.
NBA Ballers (2004), Midway Games, Inc.

Pinball
Corvette (1994)
Johnny Mnemonic (1995)
NBA Fastbreak (1997)
Monster Bash (1998)
Revenge From Mars (1999)
Playboy (2002)
The Lord of the Rings (2003)
The Sopranos (2005)
Batman (pinball) (2007)
Transformers (pinball) (2011)
The Avengers (2012)
Batman 66 (2016)
Spider-Man The Pin (2017) (consumer game)
Supreme (2017) (Private Label)
The Beatles (2018)
Deadpool (2018)
Star Wars Pin (2019) (consumer game)
James Bond 007 (2022)

References

External links
George Gomez at the Internet Pinball Database

Pinball game designers
American video game designers
Living people
Gomez, George Born June 1, 1955